Jean-Michel Simonella (born March 27, 1962) is a former professional footballer who played as a goalkeeper.

External links
Jean-Michel Simonella profile at chamoisfc79.fr

1962 births
Living people
French footballers
Association football goalkeepers
Nîmes Olympique players
FC Istres players
Chamois Niortais F.C. players
Ligue 2 players
INF Vichy players
Footballers from Toulouse